Maslikha is a rural locality (a village) in Pogorelovskoye Rural Settlement, Totemsky District, Vologda Oblast, Russia. The population was 10 as of 2002.

Geography 
Maslikha is located 63 km southwest of Totma (the district's administrative centre) by road. Yakunikha is the nearest rural locality.

References

Rural localities in Tarnogsky District